The Brodtberg, at , is the highest hill in Remscheid and the region of Düsseldorf in Germany. Despite that, it is not particularly prominent; for example the nearby quarter of Lennep lies at elevations of up to 370 metres.

Geography 

The hill is located in the quarter of Hohenhagen and belongs to the borough of Remscheid-Süd. The Brodtberg lies west of the hill of Westerholt, the second highest point in Remscheid.

References

External links 
 Steinbruch-Hohenhagen Nature Reserve

Mountains and hills of North Rhine-Westphalia
Bergisches Land
Remscheid